A Little Matter of Genocide: Holocaust and Denial in the Americas 1492 to the Present (1997) is a book written by Ward Churchill. A Little Matter of Genocide surveys ethnic cleansing from 1492 to the present. Churchill compares the treatment of North American Indians to historical instances of genocide by communists in Cambodia, Turks against Armenians, and Europeans against the Gypsies, as well as Nazis against the Poles and Jews.

Academic context 
Churchill has debated historian Deborah Lipstadt over the singularity of the Holocaust. In a 1996 review of Lipstadt’s book Denying the Holocaust, Churchill defended the German philosopher Ernst Nolte, whom Lipstadt criticized for asserting that the Holocaust was a non-singular event. Churchill argues that the Holocaust was one of many genocides, as opposed to Lipstadt’s view of the Holocaust as a singular event.  In A Little Matter of Genocide, Churchill accuses Lipstadt of denying the genocide of Native Americans, notwithstanding his respect for her work.  Churchill argues that by claiming that the Holocaust cannot be equated to anything else in human history, citing its uniqueness, one does not recognize the genocide of Native Americans to be as morally despicable as the Holocaust, and denies the true nature of that genocide.

Publishing information

References 

1997 non-fiction books
Non-fiction books about Native Americans
Books by Ward Churchill
City Lights Publishers books